The Women's 200m Individual Medley at the 2007 World Aquatics Championships took place on 25 March (prelims & semifinals) and the evening of 26 March (finals) at the Rod Laver Arena in Melbourne, Australia. 50 swimmers were entered in the event, of which 49 swam.

Existing records at the start of the event were:
World Record (WR): 2:09.72, WU Yanyan (China), 17 October 1997 in Shanghai, China.
Championship Record (CR): 2:10.41, Katie Hoff (USA), Montreal 2005 (25 July 2005)

Results

Final

Semifinals

Preliminaries

See also
 Swimming at the 2005 World Aquatics Championships – Women's 200 metre individual medley
 Swimming at the 2008 Summer Olympics – Women's 200 metre individual medley
 Swimming at the 2009 World Aquatics Championships – Women's 200 metre individual medley

References

Women's 200m IM Preliminary results from the 2007 World Championships. Published by OmegaTiming.com (official timer of the '07 Worlds); Retrieved 2009-07-11.
Women's 200m IM Semifinals results from the 2007 World Championships. Published by OmegaTiming.com (official timer of the '07 Worlds); Retrieved 2009-07-11.
Women's 200m IM Final results from the 2007 World Championships. Published by OmegaTiming.com (official timer of the '07 Worlds); Retrieved 2009-07-11.

Swimming at the 2007 World Aquatics Championships
2007 in women's swimming